Kosteletzkya is a genus of the plant family Malvaceae that includes the seashore mallow (K. pentacarpos). It includes about 27 species found worldwide.

Although similar in appearance to Hibiscus, Kosteletzkya typically bears more flattened capsules that dehisce loculicidally. The genus was separated from Hibiscus in 1835 by Carl Borivoj Presl, who named it after Vincenz Franz Kosteletzky (1801–1887).

Phylogenetic evidence supports this genus being polyphyletic, with New World and Malagasy species of Kosteletzkya belonging to completely different clades within the Hibisceae. Under a revised nomenclature, only New World species would retain the genus name Kosteletzkya. An alternate revision would be to merge all New World Kosteletzkya species into Hibiscus.

Species 
These species are recognized by Plants of the World Online as of June 2022:
Kosteletzkya adoensis
Kosteletzkya batacensis
Kosteletzkya begoniifolia 
Kosteletzkya blanchardii
Kosteletzkya borkouana
Kosteletzkya buettneri
Kosteletzkya depressa - stinging mallow or white fenrose
Kosteletzkya diplocrater
Kosteletzkya flavicentrum
Kosteletzkya grantii 
Kosteletzkya hispidula
Kosteletzkya macrantha
Kosteletzkya madagascariensis 
Kosteletzkya malvocoerulea 
Kosteletzkya pentacarpos  - seashore mallow
Kosteletzkya racemosa
Kosteletzkya ramosa
Kosteletzkya reclinata
Kosteletzkya reflexiflora
Kosteletzkya retrobracteata
Kosteletzkya rotundalata
Kosteletzkya semota
Kosteletzkya thouarsiana
Kosteletzkya thurberi
Kosteletzkya tubiflora 
Kosteletzkya velutina 
Kosteletzkya wetarensis

References

 
Malvaceae genera
Taxa named by Carl Borivoj Presl